William Hilton Jr (1617-1675) was an English explorer who explored the coast of The Carolinas in what is today the United States.

Hilton was born in 1617, Northwich, Cheshire, England. His father came to the New England colonies in 1621, with William Jr and his mother following two years later on the ship Anne. He settled first in Newbury, Massachusetts, then from 1654 onwards he resided in Charlestown, Massachusetts.

His expeditions took him all over the east coast of America and to the Caribbean. In August 1662, Hilton sailed from Massachusetts Bay Colony on the ship Adventurer, returning in October of that year with enough information to map the Cape Fear coast.  In the British Museum there is a map entitled Discouery made by William Hilton of Charles towne In New England Marriner from Cape Hatterask Lat: 35 : 30'. to ye west of Cape Roman in Lat: 32.30' In ye yeare 1662 And layd Down in the forme as you see by Nicholas Shapley of the town aforesaid November 1662.

In 1663 he was commander of the ship Adventure, and his Relation of a Discovery lately made on the Coast of Florida was published in London the following year.  On August 10, 1663, he sailed from Barbados and the expedition was "set forth by several Gentlemen and Merchants of the Island of Barbadoes."  On this voyage he explored the Carolina coast and gave names to many of the features, including Hilton Head.  In 1671 he commanded the Amity and transported several passengers from Barbados to Boston.

Hilton died in Charlestown in 1675.

References

17th-century English people
17th-century explorers
Age of Discovery
English explorers
English sailors
English navigators
English explorers of North America
Explorers of the United States
1617 births
1675 deaths
People from Northwich